PR3 may refer to:
 Polskie Radio Program III, a radio channel broadcast by the Polish public broadcaster Polskie Radio
 The third of three categories of para-rowing, also known as adaptive rowing
Proteinase 3, a serine protease enzyme expressed mainly in neutrophil granulocytes

PR-3 may refer to:
 Puerto Rico Highway 3